Stefan Getsov (27 December 1929 – 8 August 2020), nicknamed Tseko, was a Bulgarian footballer who played as a forward and made one appearance for the Bulgaria national team.

Career
Getsov earned his first and only cap for Bulgaria on 30 October 1950 in a friendly match against Poland, which finished as a 0–1 loss in Sofia.

Personal life
Getsov died on 8 August 2020 at the age of 90.

Career statistics

International

References

External links
 

1929 births
2020 deaths
Sportspeople from Ruse, Bulgaria
Bulgarian footballers
Bulgaria international footballers
Association football forwards
PFC Slavia Sofia players
PFC Levski Sofia players
First Professional Football League (Bulgaria) players